The following is a list of  people associated with the University of Wisconsin–Madison in the field of  athletics.

American football

Jared Abbrederis, NFL wide receiver, Green Bay Packers
Dave Ahrens, retired NFL player 
Art Albrecht, former NFL player 
Bill Albright, retired NFL player, New York Giants 
Alan Ameche, 1954 Heisman Trophy winner, NFL player, Baltimore Colts 
Norm Amundsen, retired NFL player, Green Bay Packers 
Mark Anelli, NFL player 
Jim Bakken, retired NFL player, St. Louis Cardinals 
Tom Baldwin – NFL player, New York Jets
Montee Ball, free agent NFL running back, Denver Broncos
Shorty Barr, NFL player and head coach 
Travis Beckum, NFL player, New York Giants 
Ken Behring, former owner, Seattle Seahawks 
Chuck Belin, retired NFL player, Los Angeles/St. Louis Rams 
Marty Below, member of the College Football Hall of Fame 
Michael Bennett, NFL player, Oakland Raiders 
Scott Bergold, retired NFL player, St. Louis Cardinals 
Lee Bernet, retired professional football player, Denver Broncos 
Darrell Bevell, NFL assistant coach, Seattle Seahawks 
Erik Bickerstaff, NFL player 
Adolph Bieberstein, retired NFL player, Green Bay Packers and Racine Tornadoes 
Brooks Bollinger, retired NFL player, Dallas Cowboys 
Brian Bonner, retired NFL player, San Francisco 49ers and Washington Redskins 
Fred Borak, retired NFL player, Green Bay Packers 
Chris Borland, retired NFL linebacker, San Francisco 49ers
Kyle Borland, retired NFL player, Los Angeles Rams
Ken Bowman, retired NFL player and CFL assistant coach 
Donny Brady, retired NFL player, Cleveland Browns and Baltimore Ravens 
Gil Brandt, retired NFL executive, Dallas Cowboys 
Roman Brumm, retired NFL player 
Wendell Bryant, retired NFL player, Arizona Cardinals 
Cub Buck, retired NFL player and head coach of the Miami Hurricanes football team 
Dan Buenning, NFL player, Chicago Bears 
Tom Burke, retired NFL player, Arizona Cardinals 
Jason Burns, retired NFL player, Cincinnati Bengals
George Burnside, retired NFL player, Racine Tornadoes 
Alfred L. Buser, All-American football player, former head football coach of the University of Florida 
Bob Butler, member of the College Football Hall of Fame 
Brian Calhoun, NFL player, Detroit Lions 
Len Calligaro, retired NFL player, New York Giants 
Lamar Campbell, retired NFL player, Detroit Lions 
Larry Canada, retired NFL player, Denver Broncos 
Gabe Carimi, NFL football player 
Harland Carl, retired NFL player, Chicago Bears 
Irv Carlson, retired NFL player, Kenosha Maroons 
Daryl Carter, retired NFL player, Chicago Bears 
Chad Cascadden, retired NFL player, New York Jets 
Jonathan Casillas, NFL player, New Orleans Saints 
John Cavosie, retired NFL player, Portsmouth Spartans 
Chris Chambers, NFL player, Kansas City Chiefs 
Geep Chryst, NFL assistant coach, San Francisco 49ers 
Paul Chryst, Head Coach, University of Wisconsin, Madison 
John Clay, NFL player, Pittsburgh Steelers 
John Coatta, former NFL scout, Dallas Cowboys and Seattle Seahawks 
Eddie Cochems, father of the forward pass 
Bill Collins, retired NFL player, Milwaukee Badgers 
Dave Costa, retired NFL player, San Francisco 49ers 
Ken Criter, retired NFL player, Denver Broncos 
Marcus Cromartie, NFL cornerback, San Francisco 49ers
Owen Daniels, NFL player, Baltimore, Ravens 
Boob Darling, retired NFL player, Green Bay Packers 
Don Davey, retired NFL player, Green Bay Packers and Jacksonville Jaguars 
Anthony Davis, professional football player 
Nick Davis, retired NFL player, Minnesota Vikings 
Ralph Davis, retired NFL player, Green Bay Packers 
Joe Dawkins, retired NFL player 
Ron Dayne, 1999 Heisman Trophy winner, retired NFL player, Houston Texans 
Jim DeLisle, retired NFL player, Green Bay Packers 
Jeff Dellenbach, retired NFL player 
Lee DeRamus, retired NFL player, New Orleans Saints 
Glenn Derby, retired NFL player, New Orleans Saints 
John Dittrich, retired NFL player, Chicago Cardinals and Green Bay Packers 
Jerry Doerger, retired NFL player, Chicago Bears and San Diego Chargers 
Jason Doering, NFL player, drafted by Indianapolis Colts, played for Washington Redskins 
Tom Domres, retired NFL player, Houston Oilers and Denver Broncos 
Wally Dreyer, retired NFL player, Chicago Bears and Green Bay Packers; former head coach of the University of Wisconsin–Milwaukee Panthers football team 
Bob Eckl, retired NFL player, Chicago Cardinals 
Ron Egloff, retired NFL player, Denver Broncos and San Diego Chargers 
Gary Ellerson, retired NFL player, Green Bay Packers and Detroit Lions 
Al Elliott, retired NFL player, Racine Legion 
Tony Elliott, retired NFL player, New Orleans Saints 
Larry Emery, retired NFL player, Atlanta Falcons 
Derek Engler, retired NFL player, New York Giants 
Clarence Esser, retired NFL player, Chicago Cardinals 
Lee Evans, NFL player, Baltimore Ravens 
Tom Farris, retired NFL player, Chicago Bears 
Hal Faverty, retired NFL player, Green Bay Packers 
Gene Felker, retired NFL player, Dallas Texans 
Bill Ferrario, retired NFL player, Green Bay Packers 
Jamar Fletcher, NFL player, Cincinnati Bengals 
Terrell Fletcher, retired NFL player, San Diego Chargers 
Carlos Fowler, Arena Football League player
Jim Fraser, retired NFL player, New Orleans Saints 
Travis Frederick, NFL player, Dallas Cowboys 
Jerry Frei, head coach of the Oregon Ducks football team, NFL assistant coach 
Kenny Gales, retired NFL player, Chicago Bears 
Milt Gantenbein, retired NFL player, Green Bay Packers 
Moose Gardner, retired NFL player 
Ed Garvey, former executive director, National Football League Players Association 
Aaron Gibson, retired NFL player, Detroit Lions, Dallas Cowboys and Chicago Bears
Earl Girard, retired NFL player; Green Bay Packers, Detroit Lions, and Pittsburgh Steelers 
Charles Goldenberg, retired NFL All-Pro player, Green Bay Packers 
John Golemgeske, retired NFL player, Brooklyn Dodgers 
Rudy Gollomb, retired NFL player, Philadelphia Eagles 
Melvin Gordon, NFL player, Denver Broncos 
Rick Graf, retired NFL player 
Neil Graff, retired NFL player 
Garrett Graham, NFL player, Houston Texans 
David Greenwood, retired NFL player 
John P. Gregg, head coach of the LSU Tigers football team
Bill Gregory, retired NFL player, Dallas Cowboys and Seattle Seahawks 
Nick Greisen, NFL player, Denver Broncos
Ryan Groy, NFL offensive lineman, Buffalo Bills 
Paul Gruber, retired NFL player, Tampa Bay Buccaneers 
Dale Hackbart, retired NFL player 
 Robert Halperin, Olympic (bronze) and Pan American Games (gold) yachting medalist, Wisconsin and Notre Dame and NFL football player, one of Chicago's most-decorated World War II heroes, and Chairman of Commercial Light Co.
Jim Haluska, retired NFL player, Chicago Bears 
Pat Harder, retired NFL player, Chicago Cardinals and Detroit Lions, member of the College Football Hall of Fame 
Jack Harris, retired NFL player, Green Bay Packers 
Ed Hartwell, NFL player
Rob Havenstein, NFL offensive lineman, St. Louis Rams 
Anttaj Hawthorne, NFL player 
Nick Hayden, NFL player, Carolina Panthers and Dallas Cowboys 
Donald Hayes, retired NFL player, Carolina Panthers and New England Patriots 
Stan Heath, retired NFL player, Green Bay Packers 
George Hekkers, retired NFL player 
Arnie Herber, retired NFL player, Green Bay Packers and New York Giants, member of the Pro Football Hall of Fame 
P.J. Hill, Jr., NFL player, New Orleans Saints 
Elroy Hirsch, retired NFL player, member of the Pro Football Hall of Fame 
Jon Hohman, professional football player 
Harvey Holmes, head coach of the Utah Utes and Academy of Idaho Bengals football teams and the USC Trojans football, track, and baseball teams 
Reggie Holt, retired NFL player, Green Bay Packers 
Tubby Howard, retired NFL player, Green Bay Packers 
Paul Hubbard, NFL player, Oakland Raiders 
Ken Huxhold, retired NFL player, Philadelphia Eagles 
Jack Ikegwuonu, NFL player, Philadelphia Eagles and convicted armed robber 
Erasmus James, NFL player, Washington Redskins 
Eddie Jankowski, retired NFL player, Green Bay Packers 
Jason Jefferson, NFL player, Atlanta Falcons 
Al Johnson, NFL player, New England Patriots 
Ben Johnson, retired NFL player 
Farnham Johnson, retired professional football player 
Lawrence Johnson, retired NFL player, Cleveland Browns and Buffalo Bills 
Richard Johnson, retired NFL player, Houston Oilers 
Jimmy Jones, retired NFL player, Chicago Bears 
John Jones, former NFL executive, Green Bay Packers
Tim Jordan, retired NFL player, New England Patriots 
Dick Jorgensen, NFL official 
Bryan Jurewicz former NFL player.
Greg Kabat, retired professional football player 
Matt Katula, NFL player, Baltimore Ravens 
Greg Kent, retired NFL player, Detroit Lions 
Don Kindt, retired NFL player, Chicago Bears 
Roger Knight, retired NFL player, New Orleans Saints 
Polly Koch, retired professional football player, Rock Island Independents 
Dave Kocourek, retired professional football player 
Ross Kolodziej NFL player, Arizona Cardinals 
Bob Konovsky, retired NFL player, Chicago Cardinals; member of the National Wrestling Hall of Fame and Museum 
Joe Kresky, retired NFL player 
Gary Kroner, retired professional football player 
Tim Krumrie, retired NFL player, Cincinnati Bengals; assistant coach, Kansas City Chiefs 
Ralph Kurek, retired NFL player, Chicago Bears 
Joe Kurth, retired NFL player, Green Bay Packers 
Bill Kuusisto, retired NFL player, Green Bay Packers 
Curly Lambeau, retired NFL player and head coach, co-founder of the Green Bay Packers, member of the Pro Football Hall of Fame 
Bob Landsee, retired NFL player, Philadelphia Eagles 
Dan Lanphear, retired professional football player, Houston Oilers 
Wes Leaper, retired NFL player, Green Bay Packers 
Jim Leonhard, NFL player, New York Jets 
Dave Levenick, retired NFL player, Atlanta Falcons 
DeAndre Levy, NFL player, Detroit Lions 
Alex Lewis, NFL player 
Dan Lewis, retired NFL player 
Dennis Lick, retired NFL player, Chicago Bears 
Bill Lobenstein, retired NFL player, Denver Broncos 
Dick Loepfe, retired NFL player, Chicago Cardinals 
Tony Lombardi, professional football coach
Mike London, retired professional football player, San Diego Chargers 
Milo Lubratovich, retired NFL player, Brooklyn Dodgers 
Jason Maniecki, retired NFL player, Tampa Bay Buccaneers 
Von Mansfield, retired NFL player, Philadelphia Eagles and Green Bay Packers 
Chris Maragos, NFL player, Seattle Seahawks 
Cecil Martin, retired NFL player, Philadelphia Eagles and Tampa Bay Buccaneers 
Ira Matthews, retired NFL player, Oakland Raiders 
Earl Maves, retired NFL player, Detroit Lions 
Charles McCarthy, head coach of the Georgia Bulldogs football team 
Tom McCauley, retired NFL player, Atlanta Falcons 
Thad McFadden, retired NFL player, Buffalo Bills
Chris McIntosh, retired NFL player, Seattle Seahawks 
Jack Mead, retired NFL player, New York Giants 
Taylor Mehlhaff, NFL player, Minnesota Vikings 
Ahmad Merritt, NFL player,  New York Giants 
Paul Meyers, retired NFL player 
Larry Mialik, retired NFL player, Atlanta Falcons and San Diego Chargers 
James Melka, retired NFL player, Green Bay Packers 
Ron Miller, retired NFL player, Los Angeles Rams 
John Moffitt, free agent NFL offensive lineman 
Sankar Montoute, retired NFL player, Tampa Bay Buccaneers 
Pete Monty, retired NFL player, New York Giants and Minnesota Vikings 
Mike Morgan, retired NFL player, Chicago Bears 
Emmett Mortell, retired NFL player, Philadelphia Eagles 
Brent Moss, retired NFL player, St. Louis Rams 
Don Murry, retired NFL player, Racine Legion and Chicago Bears 
Bobby Myers, retired NFL player, Tennessee Titans 
Fred Negus, retired NFL player, Chicago Bears 
Jim Nettles, retired NFL player, Philadelphia Eagles and Los Angeles Rams 
Tom Neumann, retired professional football player, Boston Patriots 
Dave Noble, retired NFL player, Cleveland Bulldogs and Cleveland Panthers 
Brad Nortman, NFL player, Carolina Panthers 
Jack Novak, retired NFL player, Cincinnati Bengals and Tampa Bay Buccaneers 
Pat O'Dea, member of the College Football Hall of Fame 
Nate Odomes, retired NFL player 
Pat O'Donahue, retired NFL player, San Francisco 49ers and Green Bay Packers 
Jonathan Orr, retired NFL player, Tennessee Titans and Oakland Raiders 
Joe Panos, retired NFL player, Philadelphia Eagles and Buffalo Bills 
George Paskvan, retired NFL player, Green Bay Packers 
Phil Peterson, former NFL player, Brooklyn Dodgers
Bob Pickens, retired NFL player, Chicago Bears 
Jason Pociask, NFL player, Seattle Seahawks 
Walter D. Powell, head coach of the Montana State Bobcats and Stanford Indians football and men's basketball teams 
Chris Pressley, NFL player, Tampa Bay Buccaneers Cincinnati Bengals
Art Price, retired NFL player, Atlanta Falcons 
Jim Purnell, retired NFL player, Chicago Bears and Los Angeles Rams 
Casey Rabach, NFL player, Washington Redskins 
Cory Raymer, retired NFL player, Washington Redskins and San Diego Chargers 
Russ Rebholz, retired NFL player 
Michael Reid, retired NFL player, Atlanta Falcons 
Bill Rentmeester, professional football player 
Pat Richter, retired NFL player, Washington Redskins, member of the College Football Hall of Fame 
Michael Roan, retired NFL player, Tennessee Titans 
Chester J. Roberts, head coach of the Miami Redskins football and men's basketball teams 
Bradbury Robinson, first player to throw a forward pass in a football game 
Rafael Robinson, retired NFL player, Seattle Seahawks and Houston/Tennessee Oilers 
Roderick Rogers, NFL player 
Tubby Rohsenberger, retired NFL player, Evansville Crimson Giants 
Gene H. Rose, retired NFL player, Chicago Cardinals 
Levonne Rowan, retired NFL player 
Joe Rudolph, retired NFL player, Philadelphia Eagles and San Francisco 49ers 
Tarek Saleh, retired NFL player, Carolina Panthers and Cleveland Browns 
Bob Schmitz, retired NFL player and scout 
Mike Schneck, NFL player, Atlanta Falcons 
John Schneller, retired NFL player, Detroit Lions 
Joe Schobert, NFL player, Cleveland Browns
O'Brien Schofield, NFL player, Atlanta Falcons 
Dave Schreiner, member of the College Football Hall of Fame 
Bill Schroeder, professional football player 
Karl Schuelke, retired NFL player, Pittsburgh Pirates 
Paul Schuette, retired NFL player 
Ralph Scott, NFL player and head coach 
Champ Seibold, retired NFL player, Green Bay Packers and Chicago Cardinals 
Mike Seifert, retired NFL player, Cleveland Browns 
Clarence Self, retired NFL player 
Matt Shaughnessy, retired NFL player, Oakland Raiders and Arizona Cardinals
Matt Sheldon, NFL assistant coach 
Mark Shumate, retired NFL player, New York Jets and Green Bay Packers 
Carl Silvestri, retired NFL player, St. Louis Cardinals and Atlanta Falcons 
Tony Simmons, Canadian Football League (CFL) player, (B.C. Lions); retired NFL player 
Eber Simpson, retired NFL player, St. Louis All-Stars 
Darryl Sims, retired NFL player, Pittsburgh Steelers and Cleveland Browns 
Len Smith, retired NFL player, Racine Legion 
Lovie Smith, NFL head coach, did not go to UW but coached linebackers for the Badgers in 1987 
Ron Smith, retired NFL player 
Ray Snell, retired NFL player 
Phil Sobocinski, retired NFL player, Atlanta Falcons 
Mike Solwold, retired NFL player 
Jim Sorgi, NFL player, New York Giants
Dezmen Southward, NFL safety, Indianapolis Colts 
Jerry Stalcup, retired NFL player, Los Angeles Rams 
Paul Stanton, retired NHL player 
Ken Starch, retired NFL player, Green Bay Packers 
Scott Starks, NFL player, Jacksonville Jaguars 
Aaron Stecker, retired NFL player, Tampa Bay Buccaneers and New Orleans Saints 
Kevin Stemke, retired NFL player 
Terry Stieve, retired NFL player, New Orleans Saints and St. Louis Cardinals 
Ken Stills, retired NFL player, Green Bay Packers and Minnesota Vikings 
John Stocco, professional football player 
Tim Stracka, retired NFL player, Cleveland Browns 
Dave Suminski, retired NFL player, Chicago Cardinals and Washington Redskins 
Jason Suttle, retired NFL player, Denver Broncos and San Francisco 49ers 
Luke Swan, NFL player 
Mark Tauscher, retired NFL player, Green Bay Packers 
Gus Tebell, retired NFL player and head coach 
Jim Temp, retired NFL player, Green Bay Packers 
Deral Teteak retired NFL player, Green Bay Packers 
Joe Thomas, NFL player, Cleveland Browns 
Donnel Thompson, retired NFL player, Pittsburgh Steelers and Indianapolis Colts 
Mike Thompson, retired NFL player 
Scott Tolzien, NFL player,  Green Bay Packers 
Clarence Tommerson, retired NFL player, Pittsburgh Pirates 
Al Toon, retired NFL player, New York Jets
Nick Toon, NFL wide receiver, St. Louis Rams 
B.J. Tucker, NFL player 
Mel Tucker, NFL head coach, Jacksonville Jaguars 
Dan Turk, retired NFL player 
Eric Unverzagt, retired NFL player, Seattle Seahawks 
Kraig Urbik, NFL player, Pittsburgh Steelers 
Eugene Van Gent head coach of the Missouri Tigers, Texas Longhorns, and Stanford Cardinal men's basketball and football teams 
Ron Vander Kelen, retired NFL player, Minnesota Vikings 
Mike Verstegen, retired NFL player, New Orleans Saints and St. Louis Rams
Evan Vogds, retired NFL player, Green Bay Packers 
Stu Voigt, retired NFL player, Minnesota Vikings 
John Waerig, retired NFL player, Detroit Lions 
Steve Wagner, retired NFL player, Green Bay Packers and Philadelphia Eagles 
Lloyd Wasserbach, retired professional football player, Chicago Rockets 
J. J. Watt, NFL player, Houston Texans 
T. J. Watt, NFL player, Pittsburgh Steelers
Derek Watt, NFL player, Los Angeles Chargers
Mike Webster, retired NFL player, member of the Pro Football Hall of Fame 
Howard Weiss, retired NFL player, Detroit Lions 
Jonathan Welsh, retired NFL player, Indianapolis Colts 
James White, NFL running back, New England Patriots
John Wilce, head coach of the Ohio State Buckeyes football team, member of the College Football Hall of Fame 
Brandon Williams, NFL player, San Francisco 49ers 
John Williams, retired NFL player 
Rollie Williams, retired NFL player, Racine Legion 
Russell Wilson, NFL player, Seattle Seahawks 
Chuck Winfrey, retired NFL player, Minnesota Vikings and Pittsburgh Steelers 
George Winslow, retired NFL player, Cleveland Browns and New Orleans Saints 
Randy Wright, retired NFL player, Green Bay Packers 
Jerry Wunsch, retired NFL player, Tampa Bay Buccaneers and Seattle Seahawks
Bob Zeman, former NFL assistant coach 
Robert Zuppke, head coach of the Illinois Fighting Illini football team, member of the College Football Hall of Fame

Baseball
Milt Bocek, former MLB player
Cy Buker, retired MLB player, Brooklyn Dodgers 
Charlie Chech, former MLB player 
John DeMerit, retired MLB player, Milwaukee Braves and New York Mets 
Vern Geishert, retired MLB player, California Angels 
Elise Harney, former professional baseball player, Kenosha Comets and Fort Wayne Daisies 
Mike Hart, retired MLB player, Minnesota Twins and Baltimore Orioles 
Bert Husting, football and baseball teams, later a major leaguer (1900–02) 
Addie Joss, former MLB player, member of the National Baseball Hall of Fame 
Thornton Kipper, former MLB player, Philadelphia Phillies 
Harvey Kuenn, retired MLB player and manager 
Lyman Linde, former MLB player, Cleveland Indians 
Stu Locklin, retired MLB player, Cleveland Indians 
Rodney Myers, retired MLB player 
Jim O'Toole, retired MLB player 
Lance Painter, retired MLB player 
Clay Perry, former MLB player, Detroit Tigers 
Paul Quantrill, retired MLB player 
Hal Raether, retired MLB player, Philadelphia Athletics/Kansas City Athletics 
Rick Reichardt, retired MLB player 
Terry Ryan, former MLB General Manager, Minnesota Twins 
Bud Selig, Baseball Commissioner 
Wally Snell, former MLB player, Boston Red Sox 
John Sullivan, former MLB player, Washington Senators and St. Louis Browns 
Red Wilson, retired MLB player 
Lewis Wolff, co-owner of the Oakland Athletics and San Jose Earthquakes

Basketball
Sam Barry, head coach of the Iowa Hawkeyes men's basketball team and USC Trojans men's basketball, baseball, and football teams; member of the Naismith Memorial Basketball Hall of Fame 
Tom Black, retired NBA player, Seattle SuperSonics and Cincinnati Royals 
Cory Blackwell, retired NBA player, Seattle SuperSonics 
Ben Braun, head coach of the Rice Owls men's basketball team 
Brian Butch, former NBA player, Denver Nuggets 
Everett Case, head coach of the North Carolina State Wolfpack men's basketball team, member of the Basketball Hall of Fame 
Bill Chandler, head coach of the Iowa State Cyclones and Marquette Golden Eagles men's basketball teams 
Paul Cloyd, retired professional basketball player 
Bobby Cook, former NBA player, Sheboygan Red Skins 
Tom Davis, head coach of the Lafayette Leopards, Boston College Eagles, Stanford Cardinal, Iowa Hawkeyes, and the Drake Bulldogs men's basketball teams 
Sam Dekker, NBA player, Houston Rockets
Duje Dukan, NBA player, Sacramento Kings
Michael Finley, retired NBA player, San Antonio Spurs 
Harold E. Foster, member of the Naismith Memorial Basketball Hall of Fame 
Paul Grant, retired NBA player 
Claude Gregory, retired NBA player, Washington Bullets and Los Angeles Clippers 
Rashard Griffith, professional basketball player 
Devin Harris, NBA player, Dallas Mavericks 
Al Henry, retired NBA player, Philadelphia 76ers 
Doug Holcomb, former professional basketball player 
Kim Hughes, NBA head coach
Trévon Hughes (born 1987), basketball player in the Israeli National League
Frank Kaminsky, NBA player, Charlotte Hornets 
John Kotz, former professional basketball player 
Marcus Landry, free agent NBA player 
Walt Lautenbach, retired NBA player, Sheboygan Red Skins 
Jon Leuer, NBA player, Phoenix Suns 
Howard Moore, former head coach of the UIC Flames men's basketball team 
Tamara Moore, WNBA player 
Harold Olsen, member of the Naismith Memorial Basketball Hall of Fame 
Kirk Penney, former player for ALBA Berlin in basketball's Euroleague, former NBA player for L.A. Clippers and Minnesota Timberwolves, currently playing for the New Zealand Breakers 
Don Rehfeldt, retired NBA player, Baltimore Bullets and Milwaukee Hawks 
Scott Roth, retired NBA player, head coach of the Dominican Republic national team and the Bakersfield Jam 
Dick Schulz, retired NBA player 
Glen Selbo, retired NBA player, Sheboygan Red Skins 
Christian Steinmetz, Hall of Fame Basketball player 
Greg Stiemsma, free agent NBA player 
Jordan Taylor, 2nd Team All-American basketball player 
Alando Tucker, former NBA player 
Andy Van Vliet (born 1995), Belgian basketball player for Bnei Herzliya Basket in the Israeli Basketball Premier League
Tracy Webster, assistant coach of the Kentucky Wildcats men's basketball team 
Mike Wilkinson, American professional basketball player in Russia with Khimki BC

Ice hockey
Sara Bauer, recipient of the Patty Kazmaier Award 
Marc Behrend, retired NHL player, Winnipeg Jets 
Dan Bjornlie, professional hockey player 
Mike Blaisdell, retired NHL player 
Rene Bourque, NHL player, Montreal Canadiens 
Alex Brooks, former NHL player 
Justin Schultz, NHL Player, Washington Capitals. 

Adam Burish, retired NHL player, Chicago Blackhawks, Dallas Stars, San Jose Sharks 
John Byce, retired NHL player, Boston Bruins 
Jim Carey, retired NHL player 
Chris Chelios, retired NHL player, Montreal Canadiens, Chicago Blackhawks, Detroit Red Wings, Atlanta Thrashers, 3-time Norris Trophy Winner 
Brianna Decker, member of the United States women's national ice hockey team, recipient of the Patty Kazmaier Award 
Tracey DeKeyser, ice hockey coach 
Jake Dowell, NHL player, Dallas Stars 
Davis Drewiske, NHL player, Montreal Canadiens 
Bruce Driver, retired NHL player, New Jersey Devils and New York Rangers 
Meghan Duggan, member of the United States women's national ice hockey team, recipient of the Patty Kazmaier Award  

Robbie Earl, former NHL player 
Mike Eaves, retired NHL player, Minnesota North Stars, Calgary Flames; Head Coach University of Wisconsin Men's Ice Hockey 
Mickey Elick, professional hockey player 

Brian Elliott, NHL player, St. Louis Blues 
Molly Engstrom, ice hockey player, Olympic medalist
Kelly Fairchild, former NHL player 
Patrick Flatley, retired NHL player, New York Islanders 
Jackie Friesen, ice hockey coach 
Jake Gardiner, NHL player, Toronto Maple Leafs
Tom Gilbert, NHL player, Edmonton Oilers 
Tony Granato, retired NHL player San Jose Sharks, Los Angeles Kings, New York Rangers; assistant coach, Pittsburgh Penguins; Winner 1996 Bill Masterton Memorial Trophy 
George Gwozdecky, head coach of the Denver Pioneers men's ice hockey team 
Dany Heatley, NHL player, Minnesota Wild 
Sean Hill, retired NHL player, Minnesota Wild, New York Islanders, Florida Panthers, Carolina Hurricanes, St. Louis Blues, Ottawa Senators, Anaheim Ducks, and Montreal Canadiens 
Matt Hussey, NHL player 
Jim Johannson, professional ice hockey player and coach, USA Hockey executive
John Johannson, retired NHL player, New Jersey Devils 
Mark Johnson, National Collegiate Athletic Association (NCAA) women's ice hockey coach; retired NHL player, New Jersey Devils, St. Louis Blues, Hartford Whalers, Minnesota North Stars, Pittsburgh Penguins; member of 1980 Miracle on Ice gold medal Olympic team 
Peter Johnson, former NHL scout, Toronto Maple Leafs 
Curtis Joseph, retired NHL player, Toronto Maple Leafs, Calgary Flames, Phoenix Coyotes, Detroit Red Wings, Edmonton Oilers, and St. Louis Blues
Hilary Knight, member of the United States women's national ice hockey team and captain of the Boston Pride of the National Women's Hockey League
Luke Kunin, NHL player (Minnesota Wild)
Erika Lawler, member of the 2009–10 United States national women's ice hockey team, Olympic medalist
Doug MacDonald, retired NHL player, Buffalo Sabres
Carla MacLeod, Olympic gold medalist, world champion ice hockey player 
Jackie MacMillan, ice hockey coach 
David Maley, retired NHL player 
Jamie McBain, NHL player, Carolina Hurricanes 
Ryan McDonagh, NHL player, Tampa Bay Lightning 
Scott Mellanby, retired NHL player, Atlanta Thrashers, St. Louis Blues, Florida Panthers, Edmonton Oilers, and Philadelphia Flyers 
Meaghan Mikkelson, member of the Canada women's national ice hockey team, Olympic gold medalist
Brian Mullen, retired NHL player, New York Islanders, San Jose Sharks, New York Rangers, and Winnipeg Jets; current New York Rangers broadcaster 
Mark Osiecki, retired NHL player, head coach of the Ohio State Buckeyes men's ice hockey team 
Sis Paulsen, ice hockey and softball coach 
Joe Pavelski, NHL player, San Jose Sharks, 2010 Olympic Silver Medalist 
Joe Piskula, NHL player, Los Angeles Kings 
Dan Plante, retired NHL player, New York Islanders 
Victor Posa, retired NHL player, Chicago Blackhawks 
Brian Rafalski, retired NHL player, Detroit Red Wings, New Jersey Devils 
Paul Ranheim, retired NHL player 
Steve Reinprecht, former NHL player, Florida Panthers, Phoenix Coyotes, Calgary Flames, Colorado Avalanche, and Los Angeles Kings 
Barry Richter, NHL player 
Mike Richter, retired NHL player, New York Rangers 
Shaun Sabol, retired NHL player, Philadelphia Eagles 
Steve Short, retired NHL player, Los Angeles Kings and Detroit Red Wings 
Gary Shuchuk, retired NHL player, Detroit Red Wings and Los Angeles Kings 
Jack Skille, NHL player, Florida Panthers 
Derek Stepan, NHL player, New York Rangers 
Bob Suter, retired NHL player, 1980 Olympics gold medalist who played in the Miracle on Icegame. 
Gary Suter, retired NHL player, San Jose Sharks, Chicago Blackhawks, and Calgary Flames; Winner 1986 Calder Memorial Trophy 
Ryan Suter, NHL player, Nashville Predators, Minnesota Wild 
Dean Talafous, retired NHL player, Minnesota North Stars 
David Tanabe, retired NHL player 
Chris Tancill, retired NHL player 
Kyle Turris, drafted into NHL 3rd overall in 2007 NHL Draft Phoenix Coyotes 
Steve Tuttle, retired NHL player, St. Louis Blues and Tampa Bay Lightning 
Jessie Vetter, Olympic athlete, world champion hockey player
Kerry Weiland, ice hockey defenceman, Olympic athlete
Brad Winchester, NHL player, San Jose Sharks 
Andy Wozniewski, former NHL player, Boston Bruins, St. Louis Blues, and Toronto Maple Leafs 
Jinelle Zaugg-Siergiej, member of the 2009–10 United States national women's ice hockey team, Olympic medalist
Jason Zent, retired NHL player, Ottawa Senators and Philadelphia Flyers

Soccer
Wes Hart, retired MLS player, Colorado Rapids and San Jose Earthquakes 
Aaron Hohlbein, MLS player, Kansas City Wizards 
Marci Jobson, head coach of Baylor Bears women's soccer team
Rose Lavelle, USWNT, and NWSL Player, Seattle OL Reign, Manchester City, and has been dating American Airlines Pilot Micah James Smith since October 2019.
Chris Mueller, MLS Player, Orlando City SC

Other
Simon Bairu, professional runner
Cindy Bremser, Olympic athlete, Pan American Games medalist
Bebe Bryans – former coach of the United States Women's National Rowing crew and current head coach in women's rowing at the University of Wisconsin–Madison
Maureen Clark, curler, Olympian
Mary Docter, former speed skater, Olympic athlete
Suzy Favor-Hamilton, former middle distance runner., Olympian
Ryan Fox, US National Team Rower
Carie Graves, Olympic gold medalist, head coach of the Harvard Crimson and Texas Longhorns women's crew teams
Dennis Hall, world champion wrestler, Olympic medalist, Pan American Gamesgold medalist
Matt Hanutke, Wisconsin Hall of Fame wrestler, four-time college All-American
Eric Heiden, Olympic five time Gold medalist, eight time world champion, founding member of the 7-Eleven Cycling Team
Russell Hellickson, Olympic medalist, Pan American Games gold medalist
Phil Hellmuth, professional poker player, has captured a record 13 World Series of Poker bracelets
Beau Hoopman, Olympic rowing gold medalist
Dan Immerfall, Olympic medalist, head referee for the International Skating Union, member of the National Speedskating Hall of Fame
Evan Jager, distance runner, current American record holder in the 3000m steeplechase
Nicole Joraanstad, national champion curler
Bill Kazmaier, former world champion powerlifter, world champion strongman and professional wrestler, won three World's Strongest Man titles
Carl Kiekhaefer, NASCAR team owner, member of the Motorsports Hall of Fame of America, former owner of Mercury Marine
Alvin Kraenzlein, Olympic gold medalist
D. Wayne Lukas, U.S. Racing Hall of Fame and American Quarter Horse Hall of Fame trainer
Mike Manley, retired middle- and long-distance runner, Olympic athlete, Pan American Gamesgold medalist
Buddy Melges, America's Cup skipper
Bob Mionske, former Olympic and professional bicycle racer
Hans J. Mueh, Director of Athletics at the United States Air Force Academy
Eric Mueller, former Olympic and National team rower, Olympic medalist
Carly Piper, swimmer, gold medalist and world record holder in the 2004 Summer Olympic Games
George Poage, athlete, first African American Olympic medal winner
Andrew Rein, former wrestler, Olympic medalist
Chris Solinsky, professional distance runner
Matt Tegenkamp, professional distance runner
Nick Thompson, Badger wrestler from 2000–2002; mixed martial artist
Jack Waite, retired professional tennis player
Jackie Zoch, rower, Olympic medalist
Gwen Jorgensen, Olympic Gold Medalist, Professional Triathlete

See also
Wisconsin Badgers
List of University of Wisconsin–Madison people

References

Athletics
University of Wisconsin-Madison